Arachosia, or Harauvatis, was a satrapy of the Achaemenid Empire. Primarily centred around the Arghandab River, a tributary of the Helmand River, it extended as far east as the Indus River. Around 330 BCE, Alexander the Great commissioned the building of Alexandropolis as Arachosia's new capital city under the Macedonian Empire. It was built on top of an earlier Persian military fortress after Alexander's conquest of Persia, and is the site of today's Kandahar in Afghanistan.

Etymology 

"Arachosia" is the Latinized form of Greek  (Arachōsíā). "The same region appears in the Avestan Vidēvdāt (1.12) under the indigenous dialect form 𐬵𐬀𐬭𐬀𐬓𐬀𐬌𐬙𐬍  - (whose -axva- is typical non-Avestan)."  In Old Persian inscriptions, the region is referred to as 𐏃𐎼𐎢𐎺𐎫𐎡𐏁, written h(a)-r(a)-u-v(a)-t-i. This form is the "etymological equivalent" of Vedic Sanskrit -, the name of a river literally meaning "rich in waters/lakes" and derived from sáras- "lake, pond." (cf. Aredvi Sura Anahita).

"Arachosia" was named after the name of a river that runs through it, known in ancient Greek as the Arachōtós and today as the Arghandab River, a left-bank tributary of the Helmand River.

Geography
Arachosia bordered on Drangiana to the west, on the Paropamisadae to the north, Hindush to the east, and Gedrosia to the south. Isidore and Ptolemy (6.20.4-5) each provide a list of cities in Arachosia, among them (yet another) Alexandria, which lay on the river Arachotus. This city is frequently misidentified with present-day Kandahar in Afghanistan, the name of which was thought to be derived (via "Iskanderiya") from "Alexandria", reflecting a connection to Alexander the Great's visit to the city on his campaign towards India. But a recent discovery of an inscription on a clay tablet has provided proof that 'Kandahar' was already a city that traded actively with Persia well before Alexander's time.  Isidore, Strabo (11.8.9) and Pliny (6.61) also refer to the city as "metropolis of Arachosia."

In his list, Ptolemy also refers to a city named Arachotus or Arachoti (acc. to Strabo), which was the earlier capital of the land. Pliny the Elder and Stephen of Byzantium mention that its original name was Cophen (Κωφήν). Hsuan Tsang refers to the name as Kaofu. This city is identified today with Arghandab which lies northwest of present-day Kandahar.

History

The region is first referred to in the Achaemenid-era Elamite Persepolis fortification tablets. It appears again in the Old Persian, Akkadian and Aramaic inscriptions of Darius I and Xerxes I among lists of subject peoples and countries. It is subsequently also identified as the source of the ivory used in Darius' palace at Susa. In the Behistun inscription (DB 3.54-76), the King recounts that a Persian was thrice defeated by the Achaemenid governor of Arachosia, Vivana, who so ensured that the province remained under Darius' control. It has been suggested that this "strategically unintelligible engagement" was ventured by the rebel because "there were close relations between Persia and Arachosia concerning the Zoroastrian faith."

The chronologically next reference to Arachosia comes from the Greeks and Romans, who record that under Darius III the Arachosians and Drangians were under the command of a governor who, together with the army of the Bactrian governor, contrived a plot of the Arachosians against Alexander (Curtius Rufus 8.13.3). Following Alexander's conquest of the Achaemenids, the Macedonian appointed his generals as governors (Arrian 3.28.1, 5.6.2; Curtius Rufus 7.3.5; Plutarch, Eumenes 19.3; Polyaenus 4.6.15; Diodorus 18.3.3; Orosius 3.23.1 3; Justin 13.4.22).
In 316 BCE Antigonus I Monophthalmus sent most of the elite Argyraspides, a veteran Macedonian corps with over forty years experience, to Arachosia to protect the Eastern frontier with India. However they were sent with the order to Sibyrtius, the Macedonian satrap of Arachosia, to dispatch them by small groups of two or three to dangerous missions so that their numbers would rapidly dwindle and remove them as a military threat to his power.

Following the Wars of the Diadochi, the region became part of the Seleucid Empire, which traded it to the Mauryan Empire in 305 BCE as part of an alliance. The Shunga dynasty overthrew the Mauryans in 185 BC, but shortly afterwards lost Arachosia to the Greco-Bactrian Kingdom. It then became part of the break-away Indo-Greek Kingdom in the mid 2nd century BCE. Indo-Scythians expelled the Indo-Greeks by the mid 1st century BCE, but lost the region to the Arsacids and Indo-Parthians. At what time (and in what form) Parthian rule over Arachosia was reestablished cannot be determined with any authenticity.  From Isidore 19 it is certain that a part (perhaps only a little) of the region was under Arsacid rule in the 1st century CE, and that the Parthians called it Indikē Leukē, "White India."

The Kushans captured Arachosia from the Indo-Parthians and ruled the region until around 230 CE, when they were defeated by the Sassanids, the second Persian Empire, after which the Kushans were replaced by Sassanid vassals known as the Kushanshas or Indo-Sassanids. In 420 CE the Kushanshas were driven out of present Afghanistan by the Chionites, who established the Kidarite Kingdom. The Kidarites were replaced in the 460s CE by the Hephthalites, who were defeated in 565 CE by a coalition of Persian and Turkish armies. Arachosia became part of the surviving Kushano-Hephthalite Kingdoms of Kapisa, then Kabul, before coming under attack from the Moslem Arabs. These kingdoms were at first vassals of Sassanids. Around 870 CE the Kushano-Hephthalites (aka Turkshahi Dynasty) was replaced by the Saffarids, then the Samanid Empire and Muslim Turkish Ghaznavids in the early 11th century CE.

Arab geographers referred to the region (or parts of it) as 'Arokhaj', 'Rokhaj', 'Rohkaj' or simply 'Roh'.

Inhabitants

The inhabitants of Arachosia were Iranian peoples, and were referred to as Arachosians or Arachoti. They were called Pactyans in reference to their individual ethnicity, and that name may have been in reference to the modern-day ethnic group known as the Pashtuns.

Isidore of Charax, in his 1st-century CE "Parthian stations" itinerary, described an "Alexandropolis, the metropolis of Arachosia", which he said was still Greek even at such a late time:

Theory of Croatian origin from the Iranian peoples 
One theory of Croatian origin traces the origin of the Croats to the area of Arachosia. This connection was at first drawn due to the similarity of Croatian (Croatia - Croatian: Hrvatska, Croats - Croatian: Hrvati / Čakavian dialect: Harvati / Kajkavian dialect: Horvati) and Arachosian name, but other researches indicate that there are also linguistic, cultural, agrobiological and genetic ties. Since Croatia became an independent state in 1991, the Iranian theory gained more popularity, and many scientific papers and books have been published.

See also
History of Afghanistan
Kandahar province
Old Kandahar

Notes

References 

 Frye, Richard N. (1963). The Heritage of Persia. World Publishing company, Cleveland, Ohio. Mentor Book edition, 1966.
 Hill, John E. 2004. The Western Regions according to the Hou Hanshu. Draft annotated English translation.
 Hill, John E. 2004. The Peoples of the West from the Weilue 魏略 by Yu Huan 魚豢: A Third Century Chinese Account Composed between 239 and 265 CE. Draft annotated English translation.
 Hill, John E. (2009) Through the Jade Gate to Rome: A Study of the Silk Routes during the Later Han Dynasty, 1st to 2nd Centuries CE. BookSurge, Charleston, South Carolina. .
 Toynbee, Arnold J. (1961). Between Oxus and Jumna. London. Oxford University Press.
 Vogelsang, W. (1985). "Early historical Arachosia in South-east Afghanistan; Meeting-place between East and West." Iranica antiqua, 20 (1985), pp. 55–99.

External links
 Arachosia
 Alexandria in Arachosia
 ARACHOSIA, province (satrapy)
  

Historical regions of Afghanistan
Ancient history of Afghanistan
Historical regions